Gilibert is a surname.  Notable people with the surname include:

 Jean Marie Marcelin Gilibert (1839–1923), French Commissioner in the French Gendarmerie
 Jean-Emmanuel Gilibert (1741–1814), French politician, botanist, freemason, and doctor

See also
 Gilbert (surname)